István Urbányi (born 17 April 1967 in Salgótarján) is a Hungarian former football player and coach.

Career
As a player, he spent most of his career at Bp. Honvéd and Győri ETO as a defender and midfielder. In 1990, he played two games for Hungary

After a nearly two decade-long career, in 1999 he also trialled with FK Lofoten in Norway.

He was the head coach of Újpest FC from December 2006 to April 2008. In the end of February 2009, he was appointed as the head coach of the national team of Maldives. His first assignment as the coach of the Maldives was the AFC Challenge Cup qualification, where Maldives faced Bhutan, Philippines and Turkmenistan. His contract ran out in 2010 and following the sides could not reach an agreement over an extension, Urbányi left the Maldives. After a brief spell on the bench of Kecskeméti TE, he was recalled by the Football Association of Maldives and worked again in the island nation between October 2011 and December 2013. He joined the ranks of the Sporting Kansas City youth academy as a coach after the invitation of his longtime friend and team manager Peter Vermes

Sources
pepsifoci.hu: Urbányi István, az Újpest vezetőedzője - brief bio 

1967 births
Living people
People from Salgótarján
Hungarian footballers
Hungary international footballers
Association football midfielders
Salgótarjáni BTC footballers
Budapest Honvéd FC players
Győri ETO FC players
Budapesti VSC footballers
San Jose Earthquakes players
Hungarian expatriate footballers
Expatriate soccer players in the United States
Hungarian expatriate sportspeople in the United States
Major League Soccer players
Hungarian football managers
Újpest FC managers
Kecskeméti TE managers
Maldives national football team managers
Expatriate football managers in the Maldives
Expatriate soccer managers in the United States
Sporting Kansas City non-playing staff
Nemzeti Bajnokság I managers
Hungarian expatriate football managers
Sportspeople from Nógrád County